Ramdhenu is a TV channel specialising in music of Assam. It was launched on 1 October 2011 and is a part of the Pride East Entertainments Pvt. Ltd. based in Guwahati, Assam owned by Riniki Bhuyan Sarma It is the first ever satellite music TV channel of the northeast India. The channel broadcast recently released music videos.

References

Television stations in Guwahati
Assamese-language mass media
Assamese-language television channels
Television channels and stations established in 2011
Pride East Entertainments

Music television channels in India